Rozga is a surname. Notable people with the surname include:

 David Rozga (died 2010), American teenager
 Jelena Rozga (born 1977), Croatian singer

See also
 

Croatian surnames